Welcome to Home Gori is a 1990 comedy-drama film directed by Alessandro Benvenuti.

It is based on a comedy play with the same name by  Ugo Chiti and the same Benvenuti. For her performance Ilaria Occhini  was awarded with a Nastro d'Argento for Best Supporting Actress. The film has a sequel, Return to Home Gori.

Plot
The film is set in a house in a Tuscan landscape, has an ironic content and a Christmas frame.
The film is divided into 5 episodes: The Family, The Lunch, Unexpected Pregnancy, The Videotape and Epilogue.

Cast
Carlo Monni: Gino Gori
Ilaria Occhini: Adele Papini
Massimo Ceccherini: Danilo Gori
Novello Novelli: Annibale Papini
Athina Cenci: Bruna Papini
Giorgio Picchianti: Libero Salvini
Alessandro Benvenuti: Lapo Frittelli

References

External links 
 

Italian comedy-drama films
Films directed by Alessandro Benvenuti
Films about dysfunctional families
1990s Italian-language films
1990s Italian films